"I Wish It Would Rain Down" is a song by Phil Collins from his 1989 album ...But Seriously, featuring lead guitar by Eric Clapton. The power ballad was a massive success in early 1990, peaking at No. 3 on the Billboard Hot 100 in the United States and No. 1 on the RPM Top 100 in Canada; in the latter country, it was the highest-selling song of 1990. It also reached No. 7 on the UK Singles Chart. Collins felt that it was as close as he had ever got, at the time, to writing a blues song.

Eric Clapton plays lead guitar throughout the song, which also features a large gospel choir. Regarding Clapton's contribution, Collins recalls, "I said 'Eric, have I never asked you to play? Come on, I've got a song right up your street.'" Collins also felt that it was a Clapton song.

Music video
The 8:30 minute-long black-and-white music video, produced by Paul Flattery and directed by Jim Yukich for FYI,  contains 2:30 minutes of acting prior to the start of the music. The setting is a theatre in the 1930s. Actor Jeffrey Tambor plays a hyper-critical, unhappy theatre director. He is rehearsing some dancers (who are dancing to the guitar/bass guitar riff from the song "Sunshine of Your Love" by the band Cream, in which Eric Clapton played guitar.) The director complains that the girls can neither dance nor sing, and then discovers that his star has appendicitis.

Eric Clapton, seated on a stool, says that Billy (played by Collins) used to be the drummer in a good band and assumed singing responsibilities when the original singer departed — an in-joke referencing Collins' tenure with the band Genesis, in which he played drums and then became the lead singer when Peter Gabriel exited the group. Members of Collins' backing band play various non-speaking parts, such as the janitor "Chester" Chester Thompson, who takes over on drums when Collins gets up to sing, as well as the bassist Leland Sklar.

Collins is forced to act with the play's star. The director deems Collins' acting "terrible," to which Collins replies, "I never said I could act, 'e [pointing to Clapton] said I could sing," and the director says, "alright, play the song." As Collins sings, his character fantasizes about becoming a famous stage actor, singer, and movie star.

Billy's name is inserted onto fake covers of major industry publications such as Variety and Billboard and newspapers such as the Denver Post. His face is inserted into still photographs from the television program You Bet Your Life (where he appears next to Groucho Marx) and films such as White Heat (where his image is inserted alongside that of James Cagney). Billy is depicted imitating the character of Davy Crockett (as played by Fess Parker on the television series of the same name), standing next to Marilyn Monroe, and acting out a scene from the 1941 film The Maltese Falcon (with Humphrey Bogart impersonator Robert Sacchi appearing in the scene). (Music video director James Yukich's name appears on the clapperboard.) Billy is shown receiving an Academy Award from Clark Gable (impersonated by actor Ralph Chelli).

During the montage, the published sheet music for the song is shown, prominently featuring Collins' photo. This is followed by a shot of the sheet music for "Something Happened on the Way to Heaven", the next single from the same album.

After the music ends, Tambor's character decides to cut the musical number, as he feels it was not any good compared to the dancing girls. The character says "the fellow on the guitar (Eric Clapton) is pretty good," but his assistant informs him that "Eric gave a week's notice." Collins, in disbelief, goes back to sit behind the drums.

The video won an International Monitor Award.

Chart performance
The song was a significant chart hit in 1990, peaking at No. 3 on the Billboard Hot 100 in the United States and No. 1 on the RPM Top 100 in Canada. In Canada it was the longest-running number one single of 1990, spending six weeks atop the charts, and ranked as the top single of the year on RPMs year-end chart. It also reached number seven on the UK Singles Chart and number three in Belgium and the Netherlands.

Formats and track listings
CD maxi/12" single
"I Wish It Would Rain Down"
"Homeless" ("Another Day in Paradise" demo)
"You've Been in Love (That Little Bit Too Long)"

7" single (UK)
"I Wish It Would Rain Down" 
""Homeless" ("Another Day in Paradise" demo)"

7" single (US/Canada)
"I Wish It Would Rain Down"
"You've Been in Love (That Little Bit Too Long)"

Personnel 
 Phil Collins – keyboards, vocals, drums, tambourine 
 Eric Clapton – guitars
 Pino Palladino – bass

Charts

Weekly charts

Year-end charts

References

1989 songs
1990 singles
1980s ballads
Phil Collins songs
RPM Top Singles number-one singles
Rock ballads
Songs written by Phil Collins
Song recordings produced by Phil Collins
Atlantic Records singles
Virgin Records singles
Warner Music Group singles